The Tijdschrift voor Entomologie (English: Journal of Entomology) is a triannual peer-reviewed scientific journal covering systematic and evolutionary entomology. It is published by Brill Publishers and the editor-in-chief is Hendrik Freitag (Ateneo de Manila University. Originally published in Dutch, the journal is now published in English only.

Abstracting and indexing
The journal is abstracted and indexed in:
Aquatic Sciences and Fisheries Abstracts
Biological Abstracts
BIOSIS Previews
CAB Abstracts
EBSCO databases
Scopus
The Zoological Record

References

External links

Entomology journals and magazines
Triannual journals
Brill Publishers academic journals
Publications established in 1857
English-language journals